CD2 antigen cytoplasmic tail-binding protein 2 is a protein that in humans is encoded by the CD2BP2 gene.

Interactions
CD2BP2 has been shown to interact with CD2.

References

Further reading

External links